The 2003 Sheffield Council election took place on 1 May 2003 to elect members of Sheffield City Council. One third of the council was up for election, and Labour took control of the council from no overall control, with six gains from the Liberal Democrats.

The election saw a trial of electronic voting in half of the council's wards. Voters in these wards were able to vote by either text message, touch tone phone, internet, post, or use electronic kiosks as well as the normal polling stations. Overall turnout was 29.5%, a half a percent fall on the previous year, a drop negated somewhat by the higher turnout in the wards trialing electronic voting.

Election result

|}

This result had the following consequences for the total number of seats on the council after the elections:

Ward results

Terence McElligot was a sitting councillor for Darnall ward

David Baker was a sitting councillor for Birley ward

References

2003 English local elections
2004
2000s in Sheffield